Rick Husky (born May 6, 1940) is an American television writer and producer perhaps best known for creating the television series T. J. Hooker.

Husky is also known for such television series as Mission: Impossible; Charlie's Angels; Tour of Duty; Walker, Texas Ranger and S.W.A.T.

References

External links

Living people
1940 births
American television writers
American television producers